"Heart Like a Wheel"/"Old Town" was a double A-sided single from The Corrs' fifth studio album, Home, released in late 2005. "Heart Like a Wheel" is a cover of the Kate & Anna McGarrigle song, and "Old Town" is a cover version of the Phil Lynott song. It is their lowest charting UK single to date (excluding non-charting singles), although in Spain "Old Town" reached the top 10, peaking at No. 8. "Heart Like a Wheel" entered the British single charts at No. 68.

Track listing
"Heart Like a Wheel"
"Old Town"

Charts

References 

The Corrs songs
2005 singles
Atlantic Records singles